Domagoj Bošnjak (born April 9, 1995) is a Croatian professional basketball player currently playing for Široki of the Basketball Championship of Bosnia and Herzegovina and ABA League Second Division. Standing at 1.98 m he plays the shooting guard and small forward positions.

Professional career 
Bošnjak started his professional career with Široki during the 2011–12 season. In August 2014 Bošnjak was loaned to Zadar in a one-year deal. After signing for Zadar and spending the 2015–16 season, in August 2016 he moved to Cibona.
After spending a season in Cedevita, in August 2019 he moved to Rouen of the French second-tier LNB Pro B League.

In February, 2020, Bošnjak returned to Široki competing in the Bosnian League and the ABA League Second Division. 

He had a very successful career with the Croatian national basketball team youth selections winning altogether three medals in international competitions. He was selected in the 2013 FIBA Europe Under-18 Championship All-tournament team.

References

External links
 Domagoj Bošnjak at aba-liga.com
 Domagoj Bošnjak at fibaeurope.com
 Domagoj Bošnjak at fiba.com

Living people
1995 births
ABA League players
Croatian men's basketball players
Croats of Bosnia and Herzegovina
HKK Široki players
KK Cibona players
KK Zadar players
Small forwards
Basketball players from Mostar